Polinago is a comune (municipality) in the Province of Modena in the Italian region Emilia-Romagna, located about  southwest of Bologna and about  southwest of Modena.

See also
Santa Maria Assunta

References

External links
 Official website

Cities and towns in Emilia-Romagna